Justice Johston may refer to:

Alexander Johnston (1775–1849), British colonial official who served as third Chief Justice of Ceylon
William Agnew Johnston (1848–1937), associate justice of the Kansas Supreme Court